Wang Su may refer to:

Wang Su (Cao Wei) (195–256), Cao Wei scholar and official
Duke Buyeo (died 1112), Goryeo royalty
Wang Su (taekwondo)

See also
Wangsu Science & Technology